Bhikhi Khurd is a small village in the Bhalwal Tehsil area of Sargodha District in Pakistan, two kilometres from the M2 motorway. Most of the population are farmers. There are two primary schools, one private school, and three private clinics. The village also has three mosques. Khurd and Kalan are Persian words which mean small and big, respectively.  When two villages have the same name, they are distinguished by these words in their names.

Gondal is a common surname in Bhikhi Khurd. Notable residents of the village include Chaudhury Ghullam Rasool Gondal, Chaudhury Sarang, Chaudhury M. Pervez Gondal, Chaudhury Adnan Pervez Gondal, late Chaudhury M. Ameer Gondal  of the Pakistani Army SSG and Chaudhury Aftab Ahmed Gondal.

References

Populated places in Sargodha District